Suwara is a surname. Notable people with the surname include:

 Ernie Suwara (born 1945), American volleyball player
 Rudy Suwara (born 1941), American volleyball player
 Wiktor Suwara (born 1996), Polish athlete

See also